Cherry Icefall is a small, steep icefall on the south side of Barnes Peak in the Queen Alexandra Range, descending toward Beardmore Glacier. It was originally named Cherry Glacier by the British Antarctic Expedition, 1910–13, for Apsley Cherry-Garrard, zoologist with the expedition. The name has been amended on the recommendation of the New Zealand Geological Survey Antarctic Expedition (1961–62) to be more descriptive of the feature.

References
 

Icefalls of the Ross Dependency
Shackleton Coast